The Snowflake Arizona Temple is the 108th operating temple of the Church of Jesus Christ of Latter-day Saints (LDS Church).

Mormon pioneers first settled Snowflake, Arizona in 1878 at the request of LDS Church president Brigham Young. The town of Snowflake was named after William J. Flake and Erastus Snow, two of the church's early leaders who helped supervise colonization of the area.

The Snowflake Arizona Temple serves 35,000 members, many of them descendants of the first pioneers to the area. The temple is set on a knoll that has become known as "Temple Hill." About eight feet was removed from the top of the knoll so the two-level temple could be built. The lower level is partially set into the knoll.

History
There are about 9,000 people who live in the Snowflake area, but more than 94,000 people attended the temple open house during February 2002. Church president Gordon B. Hinckley dedicated the Snowflake Arizona Temple in four sessions on March 3, 2002.

The exterior of the temple is finished with two tones of polished Empress White and Majestic Grey granite from China, similar to that of the Fukuoka Japan Temple. Much of the furniture has a pioneer look out of respect for the area's pioneer ancestry. The temple interior also incorporates Native American patterns stenciled on walls and woven into the carpet. Items such as handcrafted rugs, baskets, and pottery also decorate the interior. It is Arizona's second temple, the first having been dedicated in Mesa in 1927.

See also

 Comparison of temples of The Church of Jesus Christ of Latter-day Saints
 List of temples of The Church of Jesus Christ of Latter-day Saints
 List of temples of The Church of Jesus Christ of Latter-day Saints by geographic region
 Temple architecture (Latter-day Saints)
 The Church of Jesus Christ of Latter-day Saints in Arizona

References

External links
 Official Snowflake Arizona Temple page
 Snowflake Arizona Temple at ChurchofJesusChristTemples.org

21st-century Latter Day Saint temples
Buildings and structures in Navajo County, Arizona
Temples (LDS Church) completed in 2002
Temples (LDS Church) in Arizona
Tourist attractions in Navajo County, Arizona
2002 establishments in Arizona